Cernusco sul Naviglio is a suburban station on Line 2 of the Milan Metro in the municipality of the same name.

History
The station was opened in 1968, as a stop on the Milan-Gorgonzola fast tramway line. Since 4 December 1972 the section from Cascina Gobba to Gorgonzola, where this station is located, was connected to Milan Metro Line 2 and has operated as part of it ever since.

Station structure 

The station is a surface station with two tracks and two side platforms. It is located on viale Assunta, within the municipality of Cernusco sul Naviglio.

References

Bibliography
 Giovanni Cornolò, Fuori porta in tram. Le tranvie extraurbane milanesi, Parma, Ermanno Arbertelli, 1980.

Line 2 (Milan Metro) stations
Railway stations opened in 1981
1981 establishments in Italy
Railway stations in Italy opened in the 20th century